Waltham is an American rock band that formed in 1999.  The band takes its name from its hometown of Waltham, Massachusetts.  The band is composed of Frank Pino, Jr. (lead vocals), Dave Pino (lead guitar and vocals), Tony Monaco (rhythm guitar), David "Jones" Illsley (bass and vocals) and Darryl Grant (drums and vocals).

Biography

2005-2006
The band were signed by Rykodisc who issued their self-titled album in July 2005.

Waltham's "Cheryl (Come and Take a Ride)" has been used in promotions for the CBS reality TV series, The Amazing Race. The band was also featured in the Disney film America's Heart and Soul.

Frank Pino, Jr. was featured on a 2006 episode of the MTV show Made.

On July 11, 2006, they released their first Extended Play entitled Awesome - EP.

2013-present
On February 14, 2013, on the official Waltham website and Facebook page, an iPhone text Lyric video was released revealing a new song "You're Everything That I Want", and that their third studio album Wicked Waltham was released on iTunes and Spotify in 2014, marking a 9-year gap between the release of their first and second studio albums. In July 2013, the band also revealed two more songs from the album, "The Highway" and "Drive Me Crazy". In September 2013, they released a fourth song from Wicked Waltham, Stand and Fight, which was written by Dave and Frank Pino.

On November 21, 2013, the music video for "Stand and Fight" was released. On April 28, 2014, the band released Wicked Waltham as a digital download and EP. They also announced that the album would be released on vinyl in June 2014. On May 7, 2014, Waltham released Still In Love as the final track for Wicked Waltham.

Influences and sound
Their sound - a mix of melodic pop rock and hard rock riffs - has drawn comparisons to Cheap Trick and The Cars, with the band citing Rick Springfield as an influence.

Discography

Studio albums
 Permission to Build (2003)
 Waltham (2005)

EPs
 Awesome - EP (2006)
 Wicked Waltham (2014)

Side-projects and collaborations
Frank Pino Jr. released an EP under the pseudonym USA! USA! USA! entitled Whats Your Name? on October 4, 2012.
Frank also formed a group with Lauren Mangini called Lowercase Me. They plan to release their debut album sometime in 2013.
Frank Pino Jr. is featured on N Pa's concept album The Ghost Within: The Tale of Turmoil which was released on September 24, 2013.

Awards
Boston Music Awards
Best Rock/Pop Band (2005)
Song of the Year (2003) for "So Lonely"
Song of the year (200?) for "Cheryl"
Best New Band (tie) (1999)

WBCN Rock & Roll Rumble
Finalist (2000)

The Noise Poll
Best New Band (1999)

References

External links

Rock music groups from Massachusetts
Musical groups established in 1999
Rykodisc artists
1999 establishments in Massachusetts